John Holdiche (by 1508 – 1536), of Yealmbridge, Devon, was an English politician.

He was a Member (MP) of the Parliament of England for Helston in 1529.

References

1536 deaths
People from South Hams (district)
Members of the pre-1707 English Parliament for constituencies in Cornwall
Year of birth uncertain
English MPs 1529–1536